Rhopalothripoides is a genus of thrips in the family Phlaeothripidae.

Species
 Rhopalothripoides colus
 Rhopalothripoides disbamatus
 Rhopalothripoides froggatti
 Rhopalothripoides luteus
 Rhopalothripoides pickardii
 Rhopalothripoides victoriae

References

Phlaeothripidae
Thrips
Thrips genera